Southern Federal University, abbreviated as SFedU and formerly known as Rostov State University (1957–2006), is a public university in Rostov Oblast, Russia with campuses in Rostov-on-Don and Taganrog.

History
Southern Federal University is the largest research and educational establishment of Rostov Oblast. The university began to operate in Rostov-on-Don in 1915 as an affiliate part of Imperial University of Warsaw whose Russian staff had been evacuated from Poland with the onset of World War I. Later, with the collapse of Russian Empire, the university was named Donskoy University after the region of Don by the decree of Russian Provisional Government on May 5, 1917. When founded in 1915, Donskoy University was the first higher education institution in Rostov-on-Don and had four academic departments: history & philosophy, medicine, physics & mathematics, and law. In 1917–1920, during  Russian Civil War, Rostov-on-Don was under the control of the anti-Soviet coalition forces of Russian  White movement including Kaledin's Don Army. Many of the staff who found refuge at Donskoy University at that time had a strong anti-Soviet stance and students were being drafted to White Army. During the turmoil years of the Civil War the official name of the university was Bogaevsky Donskoy University named after Mitrofan Bogaevsky, assistant to  Ataman Alexey Kaledin. Following the takeover of Rostov-on-Don by Red Army in January 1920, the authority over Donskoy University passed to the Soviet government. That same year the Soviets purged the university off any seemed disloyal and pro-White movement staff members.

In 1925, Donskoy University was renamed to North Caucasus State University to reflect its status as an education center in then North Caucasus Krai. Another renaming of the university followed in 1934 giving Rostov-on-Don State University. Then again, in 1957, it was changed to Rostov State University. The latter name existed until 2006. In November 2006, Rostov State Academy of Architecture & Arts, Rostov State Pedagogical University and Taganrog State University of Radioengineering were merged into Rostov State University to form a single entity called Southern Federal University.

Marina Alexandrovna Borovskaya, president of the university, was suspended by the European University Association (EUA) following support for the 2022 Russian invasion of Ukraine by the Russian Union of Rectors (RUR) in March 2022, for being "diametrically opposed to the European values that they committed to when joining EUA”.

Academics

University centers and degree-granting institutions

 Main campus of SFedU (former Rostov State University)
 Faculty of Biology and Soil Science
 Faculty of Chemistry
 Faculty of Economics
 Faculty of Geology & Geography
 Faculty of High Techs
 R&D Center on Piezoelectric Engineering "Piezopribor"
 Faculty of History
 Faculty of Law
 Faculty of Mathematics, Mechanics & Computer Science
 Faculty of Philology & Journalism
 Faculty of Philosophy & Cultural Studies
 Faculty of Psychology
 Faculty of Physics
 Faculty of Regional Studies
 Faculty of Social and Political Science
 Institute of Economics and International Relations

 Pedagogical Institute (former Rostov State Pedagogical University)
 Faculty of Linguistics & Philology
 Faculty of Pedagogy & Psychology
 Faculty of Physical Education & Sport
 Faculty of Economics, Management & Legal Studies
 Faculty of Natural Sciences
 Faculty of Technology & Entrepreneurship
 Faculty of Visual Arts
 Faculty of Mathematics, Physics & Computer Sciences
 Faculty of Continuing and Extended Education
 Faculty of Advanced Training & Professional Development for Teachers
 Taganrog Institute of Technology (abbreviated as TIT, former Taganrog State University of Radioengineering)
 Institute of Architecture & Arts (former Rostov State Academy of Architecture & Arts)
 The Smart Materials Research Center

Rankings 

In 2017, Times Higher Education ranked the university within the 801-1000 band globally.

Degree mill
The volunteer community network Dissernet has discovered multiple cases of PhD level degrees being awarded by the university for heavily plagiarized theses.

Alumni and faculty

Alumni
 Alexander Ankvab, President of Abkhazia
 Alexander Bovin, journalist, political scientist and diplomat
 Aleksander Burba, chemist, founder of metallurgy of germanium
 Alexander Fedorov, media educator, film critic, editor of Media Education Journal
 Zinaida Ermol’eva, microbiologist and biochemist who developed first Soviet-made antibiotics, recipient of numerous Soviet awards
 Sergey Shakhray, deputy Prime Minister of Russia
 Aleksandr Solzhenitsyn, writer Nobel prize winner
 Valery Tarsis, writer.
 Tony Vilgotsky, writer

Faculty
 Dmitry Morduhai-Boltovskoi, mathematician
 Dmitri Ivanovsky, botanist, founder of virology
 Ivan Alekseyevich Kornilov, Soviet general
 Vladimir Semyonovich Semyonov, Soviet diplomat
 Sabina Spielrein, psychoanalyst
 Iosif Vorovich, mathematician
 Yuri Zhdanov, chemist, rector of the University of Rostov (1957—1988)

See also
 List of modern universities in Europe (1801–1945)

References

External links
Official site of Southern Federal University 
Official site of "Piezopribor" - R&D center affiliated with SFedU 
Official site of Institute of Economics and International Relations 
Official site of Taganrog Institute of Technology 
 

 
Federal universities of Russia